Aberystwyth Town Football Club is a Welsh semi-professional football team, currently playing in the Cymru Premier, the top tier of football in Wales. They are the only top flight men's football team in Ceredigion.

The club was founded in 1884, and plays at Park Avenue, Aberystwyth, where their ground accommodates 5,000 spectators with 1,000 of that capacity seated. The club is one of the founding members of the Cymru Premier.

The club's youth team, Aberystwyth Town Under 19's, currently play in the Welsh Premier Development League – South, whilst the Women's team play in the Genero Adran Premier. The club has an academy, which has produced many players that have played for the first team and some that have gone on to play at higher levels.

History

Foundation and early years
Although Aberystwyth Town FC was formed in 1884, the club probably existed in the 1870s in an earlier incarnation – the re-establishment of a "town" club is recorded in 1876. The club was founded by Arthur Hughes, son of a local solicitor, and his brothers Jack and Hugh. Although football had been played in the town since at least the early 1870s, it was in October 1884 that Arthur Hughes placed an advertisement in the local press: Aberystwyth Football ClubGentlemen wishing to join the above club are requested to attend a meeting to be held at the Belle Vue Hotel on Saturday, the 4th inst., at 4pm. Members' subscriptions to be paid in advance, 2s. 6d.
The club's early days were limited to friendly matches, as the club did not join a league until 1896. It joined the Welsh League for a year, before reverting to playing friendlies again. In 1900 Town beat Druids 3–0 in the Welsh Cup final and became the first team from mid-Wales to take the trophy.

1945–2000
The club joined the Welsh League (South) in 1951, although they also continued to field a team in the Mid-Wales League, and for a while in the Cambrian Coast League. Aberystwyth returned to the Mid-Wales competition in 1963 but did not win the league championship until 1984, after having been runners-up six times. They retained the title the following season, both under team boss Meirion Appleton.

In 1987 they returned to the Welsh League (South). They were three times runners-up before they became founder members of the League of Wales in 1992. Aberystwyth achieved third in the first season. Aberystwyth Town are one of only three teams that have taken part in each season of the Cymru Premier; the others are Bangor City and Newtown. Manager Meirion Appleton was replaced by Barry Powell after a 5–0 home defeat to Caersws. In 1998/9 they qualified to represent Wales in the UEFA Intertoto Cup.

Aberystwyth lost 3–4 over two legs against Floriana of Malta. The success of European qualification brought many changes to Park Avenue. There were a new BBC studio and TV gantry, followed by the new Dias stand which brought the number of seats in the two stands up to nearly 600. The Dias stand was named after David "Dias" Williams, who holds the club scoring record of 476 goals in only 433 games between 1966 and 1983.

The club did not qualify for European football again, but they gained entry to the FAW Premier Cup competition for the third year running. They reached the quarter-finals twice. Barry Powell left the club by mutual consent.

21st century
Powell was replaced at the beginning of the 2001–02 season by Frank Gregan. Gregan was unanimously voted in as new manager before the start of the season. He was responsible for bringing in several players with extensive experience in the English pyramid. Town lost in the Welsh Cup to Aberaman Athletic in October 2001. This was combined with a poor away record and an exit from the later stages of the FAW Premier Cup at the hands of Caersws.

Gary Finley took over as player/manager immediately after Gregan departed for Weston-super-Mare. There was an instant improvement in form and minimal additions to the squad despite most of Gregan's signings departing. The club missed out on the FAW Premier Cup, ending up in ninth place in the league.

Finley took the club to fourth in 2003–04 and the club again qualified for the UEFA InterToto Cup, but following a policy decision to base the team on more local players, Finley departed and David Burrows took over as player/manager. The change of strategy produced a worsening of results in 2004/05, but the club's management decided to stick with the Ceredigion player policy despite seeing Park Avenue attendances slump by nearly 40%.

The club received a further setback in December 2004 when a serious fire destroyed much of the social club's facilities, ruling out the ground for the staging of cup finals until the new John Charles lounge was opened in 2005 by his widow, Glenda.

After several undistinguished seasons, the Seasiders reached the final of the Welsh Cup in 2009 under manager Brian Coyne, only to be beaten 2–0 by Bangor City F.C. Coyne stepped down early the following season with Alan Morgan appointed as the new boss, and the club finished fourth in the 2009–10 season, missing out on qualification for Europe.

Then in the first season of the Cymru Premier Super 12, Aberystwyth, although in the top six for most of the first half of the season, were in the bottom half of the table at the mid season split, being beaten to the top half again by Port Talbot. The club finished in seventh place, before beating Airbus in the UEFA Europa League playoff quarter final, and eventually losing out to Neath F.C. in the semi-final.

In the 2011–12 season Aberystwyth Town found itself in the bottom six again, and in a relegation battle. After a defeat to Cymru Alliance side Cefn Druids A.F.C. in the Welsh Cup, Alan Morgan stepped aside and Tomi Morgan returned as manager. Under Morgan the team finished in eighth place, and so qualified once again for the end of season Europa League playoffs. After beating Airbus U.K in the quarter finals, Aber faced Llanelli but lost in extra time.

The club created history for all the wrong reasons by losing 10–1 to The New Saints in their second home game of the 2019–20 season.

On the 2nd December 2022, Aberystwyth Town lost 11-0 to The New Saints, their largest ever defeat.
–

Records

Biggest victories and losses
Biggest win: 21–1 v. Machynlleth in 1934.
Biggest defeat: 1–20 v. Caersws in 1962.
Biggest League of Wales win: 6–0 v. Briton Ferry Athletic and Llanidloes Town, both in 1993. Also by a margin of six, Afan Lido 0 Aberystwyth Town 6 on Tuesday 18 February 2014, Aberystwyth Town 7 Afan Lido 1 on Friday 28 March 2014 and Aberystwyth Town 7–1 Prestatyn on 16 December 2017.
Biggest Cymru Premier defeat: 0–11 v. The New Saints on 2 December 2022.

European record

Players

Current squad
The following players have been confirmed as part of the 2022–23 squad.

Out on loan

Development squad

Staff

Manager History

 Angus McLean (Player/Manager) (1951–??)
 Ron Cullum 1974-1977
 Ron Jones 1977-1979
 Brian Morris 1979-1980
 Chris Brown 1980-1981
 Meirion Appleton (1981-1992)
 Tomi Morgan (1992 – September 1994)
 Meirion Appleton (September 1994 – February 1999)
 Barry Powell (March 1999 – May 2001)
 Frank Gregan (June 2001 – November 2001)
 Gary Finley (November 2001 – August 2004)
 David Burrows (August 2004– November 2005)
 Brian Coyne (November 2005 – September 2009)
 Christian Edwards (interim) (September 2009 – November 2009)
 Alan Morgan (November 2009 – February 2012)
Tomi Morgan (29 February 2012 – 9 May 2013)
 Ian Hughes (21 May 2013 – 19 April 2016)
 Wyn Thomas (interim) (14 January 2016 – 19 April 2016)
 Matthew Bishop (24 May 2016 – 21 May 2017)
 Tony Pennock (21 May 2017 – 15 June 2017)
 Neville Powell (12 July 2017 – 28 March 2018)
 Seamus Heath (28 March 2018 – 9 August 2018)
 Neville Powell (3 October 2018 – 27 January 2019)
 Gavin Allen (interim) (27 January 2019 – 24 March 2019)
 Matthew Bishop (24 March 2019 – 15 June 2020)
 Gavin Allen (15 June 2020 – 24 May 2021)
 Antonio Corbisiero (2 June 2021 – 12 May 2022)
 Anthony Williams (28 May 2022 – present)

Notable former players
1. Players that have played/managed in the football league or any foreign equivalent to this level (i.e. fully professional league).
2. Players with full international caps.
3. Players that hold a club record or have captained the club.

 Andy Parkinson, played for numerous Football League clubs, including for Tranmere Rovers in the Football League Cup Final.
 Conall Murtagh, played for Wrexham when they were in League 2.
 Tom Bradshaw Called up to the Wales national team in 2015, before making his international debut against Ukraine on 28 March 2016.
 Christian Edwards, played for 6 Football League clubs, including Nottingham Forest, Swansea City and Bristol Rovers.
 Gwion Edwards, who currently plays for Ipswich Town in EFL League One.
 Jack Edwards, capped by Wales.
 John Hughes, capped twice by Wales, played for Aberystwyth 1873–79.
 Marc Lloyd-Williams, the Cymru Premier's all-time top scorer, with 319 career goals.
 Dr. Robert Mills-Roberts, Welsh international goalkeeper in the 1880 and 1890s.
 Grenville Morris, capped by Wales whilst at the club, moved to play for Swindon Town and Nottingham Forest.
 Charlie Parry, capped 13 times by Wales prior to joining the club in 1899, won Welsh Cup with Aberystwyth in 1900.
 Ernest Peake, Welsh international who subsequently played for Liverpool.
 Leigh Richmond Roose The goalkeeper was selected to represent Wales while playing for Aberystwyth in 1900.
 Wyn Thomas, all time Cymru Premier appearance record holder with over 500 appearances.
 Alex Samuel, Welsh under 19 international who plays for Wycombe Wanderers in the EFL Championship.
 Daniel Alfei, joined the club after being released from Swansea City in 2016. After being released by Aberystwyth, Alfei joined EFL League Two side Yeovil Town
 Alan Goodall, over 300 appearances in the English Football League. Played for clubs including Chesterfield, Morecambe and Newport County.
 Rhys Norrington-Davies, Sheffield United player currently on loan at Stoke City and Wales international.
 Alhagi Touray Sisay, played for Aberystwyth five times in 2020, before moving to then EFL League Two side Grimsby Town.
 Geoff Kellaway, club legend who made over 350 club appearances over 15 years.
 Owain Jones, joined the club in 2020, previously played for Swansea City and Yeovil Town.

References

External links

 

 
Cymru Premier clubs
Mid Wales Football League clubs
Sport in Aberystwyth
1884 establishments in Wales
Montgomeryshire Football League clubs